Rob Rawlinson (born 23 August 1976) is a retired professional rugby union player, who played as a hooker. During his time at Leeds he helped them win the 2004–05 Powergen Cup, for the final of which he was a replacement. He retired in 2010 due to a neck injury.

As of 2010 he coaches rugby for Queen Ethelburga's College, England, York.

Honours
Powergen Cup/Anglo-Welsh Cup titles: 1
2005

References

External links

1976 births
Living people
English rugby union players
Leeds Tykes players
Rugby union players from Rochdale
Rugby union hookers